The Juvenile Stakes was a Thoroughbred horse race run for 109 years between 1874 and 1984. First run on June 13, 1874, it was an important part of Jerome Park's "Spring Meeting." The race was designed to show which were the top two-year-olds at that point in the calendar.

Historical notes
The Juvenile Stakes was run at four different tracks:
Jerome Park Racetrack (1874–1888)
Morris Park Racecourse (1889–1904)
Belmont Park (1905–1959, 1968–1973, 1975, 1977–1984)
Aqueduct Racetrack (1960–1967, 1974, 1976)

A field of fifteen competed in the inaugural edition won by Meco, a colt owned and trained by South Carolina native Thomas Puryear.

In 1888, French Park and Fides finished in a dead heat for first. It would remain as the only such occurrence in the 109 runnings of the event.

With the implementation of the Graded Stakes system in 1973, for that first year and again in 1974 the Juvenile Stakes was given Grade 3 status.

Selected notable winners
The 1886 running of the Juvenile Stakes was won by Tremont who would finish the year, and career, the undefeated winner of all his thirteen starts.

Broomstick won the 1903 edition of the Juvenile and continued with a stellar career in racing. At stud, he was the Leading sire in North America three times and would be inducted into U.S. Racing Hall of Fame.

In 1919, the filly Bonnie Mary won the Juvenile in which she beat twelve male and three female competitors including the very good runner-up On Watch, a colt owned by George W. Loft and trained by U.S. Racing Hall of Fame inductee Max Hirsch. The third-place finisher was Upset, the only horse to ever defeat the legendary Man o' War.

Following a win in his career debut at Florida's Hialeah Park, on May 4, 1963 Raise a Native made his second start at New York's Aqueduct Racetrack. The colt, owned by Louis Wolfson and trained by Burley Parke, was ridden by future Hall of Fame jockey Bobby Ussery in an Allowance race for two-year-olds. In what the New York Times described as a breathtaking performance, Raise a Native won by eight lengths while setting a new Aqueduct track record of 57 4/5 for five furlongs on dirt. On May 31, Raise a Native equaled his own track record in winning Aqueduct's Juvenile Stakes. The colt would go on to be named that year's American Champion Two-Year-Old Male Horse.

Four winners of the Juvenile Stakes went on to earn American Horse of the Year honors as well as a place in the U.S. Racing Hall of Fame:
Blue Larkspur (1928)
Equipoise (1930)
Nashua (1954)
Bold Ruler (1956)

Records
Speed record:
 0:47.25 @ 4 furlongs – Osric (1891)
 0:53.80 @ 5 furlongs – Bally Ache (1959)
 1:03.40 @ 5.5 furlongs – Tilt Up (1977)

Most wins by a jockey:
 7 – Eddie Arcaro (1939, 1946, 1953, 1954, 1955, 1956, 1958)

Most wins by a trainer:
 6 – James G. Rowe Sr. (1881, 1885, 1888, 1900, 1920, 1924)

Most wins by an owner:
 4 – George L. Lorillard (1879, 1880, 1883, 1884)
 4 – Dwyer Brothers Stable (1881, 1885, 1886, 1887)
 4 – Greentree Stable (1933, 1934, 1962, 1974)
 4 – Calumet Farm (1941, 1971, 1975, 1978)

Winners

References

Discontinued horse races in New York (state)
Jerome Park Racetrack
Morris Park Racecourse
Belmont Park
Aqueduct Racetrack
Flat horse races for two-year-olds
Recurring sporting events established in 1874
Recurring sporting events disestablished in 1984
1874 establishments in New York (state)
1984 disestablishments in New York (state)